Jack Reynolds (John Reynolds) (23 September 1881 – 8 November 1962) was an English football manager and player. He was the manager of Ajax Amsterdam from 1915–1925, 1928–1940, and 1945–1947. He was one of the pioneers of the Total Football system of playing and is considered among the best managers the team has had, also influencing Rinus Michels. He also managed Swiss side St Gallen.

Personal life
John was born in Whitefield, now Greater Manchester, to Elisabeth Guinness and John Reynolds. He was married to Heintje Elze.

Reynolds' older brother Billy was also a footballer.

Honours

Ajax
Netherlands Football League Championship: 1917–18, 1918–19, 1930–31, 1931–32, 1933–34, 1936–37, 1938–39, 1946–47
KNVB Cup: 1916–17

References
General
Kuper, Simon, Ajax, The Dutch, The War. Football in Europe during the Second World War, Orion Books, London (Translation of: Ajax, de Joden en Nederland ("Ajax, the Jews, The Netherlands)", 2003, 

Specific

1881 births
1962 deaths
English footballers
English football managers
Footballers from Bury, Greater Manchester
Manchester City F.C. players
Burton United F.C. players
Grimsby Town F.C. players
Sheffield Wednesday F.C. players
Watford F.C. players
Gillingham F.C. players
Rochdale A.F.C. players
FC St. Gallen managers
AFC Ajax managers
Blauw-Wit Amsterdam managers
Netherlands national football team managers
World War II civilian prisoners
English expatriate football managers
Association football wingers
English expatriate sportspeople in the Netherlands
English expatriate sportspeople in Switzerland
Expatriate football managers in the Netherlands
Expatriate football managers in Switzerland